Jayne Stadium is a 10,000-seat multi-purpose stadium in Morehead, Kentucky, United States. It opened in 1964 and is home to the Morehead State University Eagles football team. Surrounding Jacobs Field, the stadium hosts press and VIP facilities, box seats and home and visiting stands. The stadium, opened in 1964, also has locker room facilities, MSU's primary sports medicine facilities and the football offices.

The football offices have been remodeled and upgraded, and the football locker room on the north end of the facility was recently renovated and now features hardwood lockers for all players and an upgraded equipment room/storage area.

Atop the stadium, the press box can accommodate 20 working media/game day staff, and there are booths for home and visiting radio and coaches. The president's box on the second level can accommodate 50 of his guests on game day. The third floor features an open-air film deck.

Gallery

See also
 List of NCAA Division I FCS football stadiums

References

College football venues
American football venues in Kentucky
Multi-purpose stadiums in the United States
Buildings and structures in Rowan County, Kentucky
Morehead State Eagles football
1964 establishments in Kentucky
Sports venues completed in 1964